Saving Mr. Banks is a 2013 American drama film directed by John Lee Hancock, produced by Walt Disney Pictures, and starring Emma Thompson as P.L. Travers and Tom Hanks as Walt Disney. The following is list of accolades received by the film.

Accolades

Notes

References

External links
 

Saving Mr. Banks
Saving Mr. Banks, accolades
Mary Poppins